In Letter on the Blind for the Use of those who can see (French: Lettre sur les aveugles à l'usage de ceux qui voient), Denis Diderot takes on the question of visual perception, a subject that, at the time, experienced a resurgence of interest due to the success of medical procedures that allowed surgeons to operate on cataracts (demonstrated in 1728 by William Cheselden and 1747 by Jacques Daviel) and certain cases of blindness from birth. Speculations were then numerous upon what the nature and use of vision was, and how much perception, habit, and experience allow individuals to identify forms in space, to perceive distances and to measure volumes, or to distinguish a realistic work of art from reality.

According to Diderot’s essay, a blind person who is suddenly able to see for the first time does not immediately understand what he sees, and he must spend some amount of time establishing rapports between his experience of forms and distances (understandings that he first acquired by touch) and the images that were thereafter apparent to him by sight.

Religion 

In the work Diderot revealed his atheist stance, which was revolutionary at the time. He was imprisoned for that, but protection of people associated with the Encyclopédie led to his liberation after a few months.

Bibliography 
L'Aveugle et le philosophe, ou Comment la cécité fait penser, ed. Marion Chottin (Paris, Publications de la Sorbonne, 2009)
  Kate E. Tunstall, Blindness and Enlightenment. An Essay. With a new translation of Diderot's Letter on the Blind (Continuum, 2011)
  Michael Kessler, "A Puzzle Concerning Diderot’s Presentation of Saunderson’s Palpable Arithmetic," Diderot Studies, 1981, n° 20, pp. 159–173.
  Andrew Curran, "Diderot’s Revisionism: Enlightenment and Blindness in the Lettre sur les aveugles," Diderot Studies, 2000, n° 28, pp. 75–93.
  John Pedersen, "La Complicité du lecteur dans l’œuvre de Diderot à propos de la Lettre sur les aveugles," Actes du 6ème Congrès des Romanistes Scandinaves, Upsal, 11-15 août 1975, Stockholm, Almqvist & Wiksell, 1977, pp. 205–10.
  Marie-Hélène Chabut, "La Lettre sur les aveugles : l’écriture comme écart," Studies on Voltaire and the Eighteenth Century, 1992, n° 304, pp. 1245–49.
  Gerhardt Stenger, "La Théorie de la connaissance dans la Lettre sur les aveugles," Recherches sur Diderot et sur l’Encyclopédie, Apr 1999, n° 26, pp. 99–111.
  Mary Byrd Kelly, "Saying by Implicature: The Two Voices of Diderot in La Lettre sur les aveugles," Studies in Eighteenth-Century Culture, 1983, n° 12, pp. 231–241.
  M. L. Perkins, "The Crisis of Sensationalism in Diderot’s Lettre sur les aveugles," Studies on Voltaire and the Eighteenth Century, 1978, n° 174, pp. 167–88.
  Christine M. Singh, "The Lettre sur les aveugles: Its Debt to Lucretius," Studies in Eighteenth-Century French Literature, Exeter, Univ. of Exeter, 1975, pp. 233–42.

External links 
 (in French) Lettre sur les aveugles à l'usage de ceux qui voient (1749 edition)
  Lettre sur les aveugles à l'usage de ceux qui voient, audio version 

1749 books
French books
Philosophical literature